Magnetron is a 1988 video game published by Broderbund.

Gameplay
Magnetron is a game in which the player is a fighter pilot who must destroy fortresses in the Magnetron Galaxy.

Reception
David M. Wilson reviewed the game for Computer Gaming World, and stated that "A unique quality of the Magnetron is the "Galaxy Editor." This option allows players the ability to design their own Galaxy and build their own fortress. By using this mode players can create more challenging fortresses to destroy."

References

1988 video games
Broderbund games
Commodore 64 games
Commodore 64-only games
Space combat simulators
Video games developed in the United States
Video games with user-generated gameplay content